UK Foo Fighters is a Foo Fighters tribute band, formed in Harrogate, North Yorkshire, UK in 2007.

History 
UK Foo Fighters was originated from a Harrogate covers band called Speedsta that gained popularity between 2004 and 2007, playing tracks from bands such as Nirvana, Green Day, Red Hot Chili Peppers, The White Stripes, QOTSA and Stereophonics. The covers of Foo Fighters resonated with audiences and eventually attracted the attention of local promoters and festival organisers. The first ticketed show as a tribute band to Foo Fighters was at a small nightclub in Knaresborough, North Yorkshire called Daddy Cools. After a period of playing local gigs and festivals from 2007 to 2012, the band was invited to tour further afield in 2013 at various O2 Academy venues throughout the UK, owned and operated by the Academy Music Group.

On 10 September 2014 at Concorde2 in Brighton, Dave Grohl invited UK Foo Fighters frontman 'Jay Apperley' to perform 'White Limo' off the Foo Fighters album 'Wasting Light'.

On 29 March 2015 Rolling Stone magazine reported on the iHeartRadio Music Awards 10 Best and Worst Moments. Best Wish Fulfilment Fantasy; "Many performances were punctuated by short video interviews where accomplished artists recounted their "journey." The best anecdote came courtesy of the Foo Fighters, who told the story of a European gig attended by a tribute band called UK Foo Fighters. Dave Grohl, exhausted from tour, recognized his British counterpart in the crowd and invited him onstage to perform "White Limo." Apparently, the guy killed it."

In June 2015 Foo Fighters were forced to pull shows in London, Edinburgh and Glastonbury Festival due to a broken leg that frontman Dave Grohl sustained. UK Foo Fighters were approached to play London & Edinburgh dates. Gigwise reported, "already booked a train to see Foo Fighters? Here’s the solution: tribute band UK Foo Fighters will play next door for you.” NME reported, “Foo Fighters tribute band book charity gigs next door to Wembley Stadium for disappointed fans."

On 9 June 2017 BBC Music released three short films for BBC iPlayer in the run up to Glastonbury Festival, each one featuring tribute acts to the three Glastonbury headliners that year: Foo Fighters, Radiohead and Ed Sheeran. The first was entitled ‘My Hero: UK Foo Fighters’ featuring UK Foo Fighters tribute band.

On 15 June 2018 UK Foo Fighters played the ‘Opening Ceremony’ performance for WUKF World Karate Championships in front of thousands at Dundee Ice Arena.

On 28 September 2019 – UK Foo Fighters performed at the 92nd UCI Road World Championships in 2019, alongside Jarvis Cocker, The Pigeon Detectives, Litany and The Feeling.

On Monday 4 November 2019, by invitation, UK Foo Fighters entered BBC Maida Vale Studios in London to record a live session with the infamous Simon Askew.

On Monday 14 March 2022, UK Foo Fighters kicked off their 2022 tour and 15th anniversary at the city's venue, with a near sell out crowd in high spirits throughout the evening.

Band members 

Current members
Jay Apperley (as Dave Grohl) – vocals, guitar, (2007–present)
Ollie Button (as Taylor Hawkins) – drums, vocals, (2020–present)
Hurricane Henderson (as Chris Shiflett) – guitar, vocals, (2020–present)
Ricky Collins (as Pat Smear) – guitar, (2021–present)
James Wade (as Rami Jaffee) – piano, accordion, (2022–present)
Joseph Phipps-Pearson (as Nate Mendel) – bass guitar, (2023–present)

Former members
Arron Warner – bass guitar, (2007–2019)
Jamie Valentine – guitar, vocals, (2010–2020)
Alex Bailey – drums, vocals (2010–2020)
Nick Wight – keyboards, (2013–2020)
Gareth Jenkinson – bass guitar, (2019–2022)

Other musicians
Paul Winn – harmonica
Sarah Collins – vocals
Katie Lofthouse – vocals
Alice Barrott – vocals
Natalie Rawel – vocals
Abby Chapman – vocals
Leanne Stenson – vocals
Zoe Mayers – vocals
Hannah Robinson – vocals

References

External links 
 Official website

British rock music groups